Frank Blaine Withrow (June 14, 1891 – September 5, 1966), nicknamed "Kid", was a professional baseball player. He played two seasons, 1920 and 1922, in Major League Baseball for the Philadelphia Phillies, primarily as a catcher. In 58 games, Withrow had 31 hits in 153 at bats, for a .203 batting average. He batted and threw right-handed.

Withrow was born in Greenwood, Missouri and died in Omaha, Nebraska.

External links

Major League Baseball catchers
Philadelphia Phillies players
Springfield Reapers players
St. Joseph Drummers players
Wheeling Stogies players
Duluth White Sox players
South Bend Benders players
Grand Rapids Black Sox players
Rockford Rox players
Newark Bears (IL) players
New Haven Profs players
New Orleans Pelicans (baseball) players
Dallas Steers players
Baseball players from Missouri
1891 births
1966 deaths
People from Greenwood, Missouri